Congregation Beth Shalom is a synagogue located at 688 Clifton Park Center Road, Clifton Park, New York. Rabbi in 2017 is Chanan Markowitz. It is the only synagogue in southern Saratoga County. According to its 2016 "State of the Synagogue" report, it is losing members.

The synagogue was founded in 1975. It was originally a Conservative synagogue, but about 2005 it withdrew from the United Synagogue of Conservative Judaism, and as of 2017 continues unaffiliated.

The synagogue is the first Conservative synagogue to have a female rabbi: Beverly Magidson (1983-1991), who was also the synagogue’s first full-time rabbi.

References

External links
 

Synagogues in Upstate New York
Unaffiliated synagogues in the United States
Buildings and structures in Saratoga County, New York
Jewish organizations established in 1975